HMS Tantivy was a British submarine of the third group of the T class. It was built as P319 by Vickers Armstrong, Barrow, and launched on 6 April 1943.  So far it has been the only ship of the Royal Navy to bear the name Tantivy.

Service

Tantivy served in the Far East for much of its wartime career, where it sank a  Siamese sailing vessel, the Japanese merchant cargo ship Shiretoko Maru, the Japanese communications vessel No. 137, the Japanese barge No. 136, the Japanese motor sailing vessel Tachibana Maru No.47, a Japanese tug, two Japanese coasters, a Japanese sailing vessel, the small Japanese vessels Chokyu Maru No.2, Takasago Maru No.3, and Otori Maru, and twelve small unidentified vessels (all pretty well undefended and peaceable). It laid numerous mines.

It survived the war and continued in service with the Navy, finally being sunk as an anti-submarine target in the Cromarty Firth in 1951.

References

 
 

 

British T-class submarines of the Royal Navy
Ships built in Barrow-in-Furness
1943 ships
World War II submarines of the United Kingdom
Cold War submarines of the United Kingdom